The 1953–54 Drexel Dragons men's basketball team represented Drexel Institute of Technology during the 1953–54 men's basketball season. The Dragons, led by 2nd year head coach Samuel Cozen, played their home games at Sayre High School and were members of the College–Southern division of the Middle Atlantic Conferences (MAC).

The team finished the season 15–3, and finished in 1st place in the MAC in the regular season.

Roster

Schedule

|-
!colspan=9 style="background:#F8B800; color:#002663;"| Regular season
|-

References

Drexel Dragons men's basketball seasons
Drexel
1953 in sports in Pennsylvania
1954 in sports in Pennsylvania